Isaiah Dunn (born January 31, 1999) is an American football cornerback for the Seattle Seahawks of the National Football League (NFL). He played college football at Oregon State.

College career
Dunn played for the Oregon State Beavers for four seasons. Dunn finished his collegiate career with 115 career tackles, 16 pass deflections and a forced fumble in 33 games played.

Professional career

New York Jets
Dunn signed with the New York Jets as an undrafted free agent shortly after the conclusion of the 2021 NFL Draft.

Dunn was released by the Jets on August 30, 2022.

Seattle Seahawks
On August 31, 2022, Dunn was claimed off waivers by the Seattle Seahawks. He was placed on injured reserve on October 22.

References

External links
Oregon State Beavers bio
New York Jets bio

1999 births
Living people
Players of American football from California
Sportspeople from the San Francisco Bay Area
American football cornerbacks
Oregon State Beavers football players
People from Antioch, California
New York Jets players
Seattle Seahawks players